Abebe Hailou (born 19 September 1933) is an Ethiopian sprinter. He competed in the men's 100 metres at the 1956 Summer Olympics.

References

External links
 

1933 births
Living people
Athletes (track and field) at the 1956 Summer Olympics
Ethiopian male sprinters
Olympic athletes of Ethiopia
Place of birth missing (living people)